The Gilgit Division is a first-order administrative division of Pakistan's dependent territory of Gilgit-Baltistan. 

The divisional headquarters of the Gilgit Division is the town of Gilgit. Since divisions were restored in 2008, the Gilgit Division currently consists of five districts:

 Ghizer District
 Gilgit District
 Gupis-Yasin District
 Hunza District
 Nagar District

See also
 Gilgit

References

Divisions of Pakistan